"The Drag" / "Maria Stacks" is a split single release by the American garage rock acts Thee Oh Sees and Ty Segall, released in June 2009 on Castle Face Records. The release features both acts covering each other's work.

Track listing
"The Drag" – performed by Thee Oh Sees
"Maria Stacks" – performed by Ty Segall

References

Split EPs
2009 singles